The Baetic System or Betic System is one of the main systems of mountain ranges in Spain. Located in the southern and eastern Iberian Peninsula, it is also known as the Cordilleras Béticas (Baetic Mountain Ranges) or Baetic Mountains. The name of the mountain system derives from the ancient Roman region of Baetica, one of the Imperial Roman provinces of ancient Hispania.

Geography
The Baetic System is made up of multiple mountain ranges that reach from western Andalusia to the Region of Murcia, southern Castile-La Mancha and the Land of Valencia. To the north, the Baetic Ranges are separated from the Meseta Central and the Sierra Morena by the basin of the Guadalquivir. The Iberian System rises north of the eastern part of the Prebaetic System, the northernmost prolongation of the Baetic System. Generally the mountain ranges that are part of this system are aligned in a southwest-northeast direction.
 
The most well-known range of the Baetic System is the Sierra Nevada, where the Mulhacén, the highest mountain in continental Spain and in the Iberian Peninsula is found. 
The Rock of Gibraltar is also considered to be part of the Baetic System, but not the Cabo de Gata area further east which includes rocks of volcanic origin.

Geology
The Baetic System as a geological feature belongs to a larger orogeny usually called the Gibraltar Arc, which represents the westernmost edge of the Alpine Orogeny. The geodynamic mechanisms responsible for its formation are so far relatively unknown.

Geologically the Rif mountains in Morocco and the Serra de Tramuntana in the island of Majorca are extensions of the Baetic System.
The Gibraltar Arc geological region follows the Moroccan coast from Oujda in the east to Tangier in the west, then crosses the Strait of Gibraltar and goes east again from Cádiz to Valencia and the Balearic Islands.

Ecology
The Baetic System is home to a number of Mediterranean forests, woodlands, and scrub plant communities, including shrublands, oak woodlands, broadleaf forests, and coniferous forests, which vary with elevation, soils, and topography.

The Baetic System, together with the Rif Mountains of Morocco, which face the Baetic Ranges across the Alboran Sea, is one of the Mediterranean basin's ten biodiversity hotspots, known to ecologists as the Baetic-Rifan complex. The Baetic mountains are home to a rich assemblage of Mediterranean plants, including a number of relict species from the ancient laurel forests, which covered much of the Mediterranean basin millions of years ago when it was more humid.

Subdivision
The Baetic System is divided into the following sub-chains:

Penibaetic System

The Penibaetic System includes the highest point in the peninsula, the 3,478 m high Mulhacén in the Sierra Nevada; other ranges and features are:

Serranía de Ronda
Rock of Gibraltar
Sierra de las Nieves
Sierra Blanca
Cordillera Antequerana
Sierra de Tejeda
Sierra de Almijara
Sierra de Alhama
Sierra Nevada
Sierra de Lújar
Sierra de la Contraviesa
Sierra de Cogollos
Sierra de Gádor
Sierra de Baza
Sierra de los Filabres
Sierra de Alhamilla
Sierra Espuña
Sierra Cabrera
Sierra de las Estancias
The Surco Intrabético comprises a series of valleys and depressions separating the Penibaetic from the Subbaetic System

Subbaetic System

The Subbaetic System occupies a central position within the Baetic System.

Sierra del Aljibe, includes the Alcornocales Natural Park
 Sierra de Grazalema
 Sierra de Gibalbín
Sierras Subbéticas de Córdoba
 Sierra Elvira
 Sierra de Loja
 Sierra de Arana
Sierra de Cogollos
 Sierra de la Alfaguara
 Sierra de Huétor
 Sierra Sur de Jaén overlapping with the Prebaetic System

Prebaetic System

The Prebaetic System is the northernmost feature of the whole Baetic System. Highest point 2,382 m high La Sagra.

Sierra Mágina
Sierra de la Sagra
Sierra de Cazorla
Sierra de Segura
Sierra de Alcaraz
Sierra de Castril
Sierra de la Sagra
Sierra del Taibilla
Sierra de María, overlapping with the Penibaetic System
Serra Mariola
Montgó Massif
Sierra de Bernia
Penyal d'Ifac

See also 
Geography of Spain
Geology of the Iberian Peninsula
Baetic Depression
Tabernas Desert

References

External links

Sierra Nevada Natural Park
Sierra del Aljibe
 Parque Natural de la Sierra de los Filabres y comarca del Alto Almanzora
Cuenca del Guadalquivir

 
Physiographic provinces
Environment of the Mediterranean
Mountain ranges of Andalusia
Mountain ranges of the Region of Murcia
Mountain ranges of Castilla–La Mancha
Mountain ranges of the Valencian Community